Lee County is a county located in the U.S. state of Texas. As of the 2020 census, its population was 17,478. Its county seat is Giddings. The county was founded in 1874 and is named for Confederate General Robert E. Lee. The county has many Confederate memorials and monuments to the Confederate States of America.

Geography

Major highways
  U.S. Highway 77
  U.S. Highway 290
  State Highway 21

Adjacent counties
 Milam County (north)
 Burleson County (northeast)
 Washington County (east)
 Fayette County (southeast)
 Bastrop County (southwest)
 Williamson County (northwest)

Demographics

Note: the US Census treats Hispanic/Latino as an ethnic category. This table excludes Latinos from the racial categories and assigns them to a separate category. Hispanics/Latinos can be of any race.

As of the census of 2000, 15,657 people, 5,663 households, and 4,150 families were residing in the county. The 6,851 housing units had an average density of 11 per square mile (4/km2). The racial makeup of the county was 76.59% White, 12.08% African American, 0.46% Native American, 0.24% Asian,  8.90% from other races, and 1.72% from two or more races. About 18.19% of the population were Hispanics or Latinos of any race. About 35.5% were of German and 8.3% American ancestry according to Census 2000; 80.1% spoke English, 14.4% Spanish, and 5.1% German as their first language. Of the 5,663 households,  35.7% had children under 18 living with them, 60.0% were married couples living together, 8.8% had a female householder with no husband present, and 26.7% were not families. About 23.8% of all households were made up of individuals, and 11.7% had someone living alone who was 65  or older. The average household size was 2.65, and the average family size was 3.15. In the county, the age distribution was 28.8% under 18, 9.2% from 18 to 24, 26.3% from 25 to 44, 21.4% from 45 to 64, and 14.4% who were 65 or older. The median age was 36 years. For every 100 females, there were 101.60 males. For every 100 females 18 and over, there were 98.0 males. The median income for a household in the county was $36,280, and for a family was $42,073. Males had a median income of $30,635 versus $21,611 for females. The per capita income for the county was $17,163. About 9.70% of families and 11.90% of the population were below the poverty line, including 13.70% of those under age 18 and 16.10% of those 65 or over. As of the 2010 census, Lee County has a similar ethnic makeup compared to the overall United States.

Politics
Lee County was historically Democratic, although less so than the majority of Texas, as it was somewhat allied with the isolated Republican German-American Unionist stronghold centered in Gillespie and Kendall Counties. It nonetheless voted Democratic in every election up to 1976 except the landslide Republican triumphs of 1956 and 1972, plus the heavily war-influenced elections of 1916 and 1940, when its German-American population was suspicious of the Democratic Party's position towards Germany. Since 1980, like all of the rural white South, Lee County has become powerfully Republican. No Democratic presidential candidate has won a majority in the county since Jimmy Carter in 1976, although during the drought- and farm crisis-dominated 1988 election Michael Dukakis won a 14-vote plurality. In the past five elections, the GOP candidate has always passed two-thirds of the county's vote and Donald Trump exceeded three-quarters in 2016 & 2020.

Government and infrastructure

The Texas Youth Commission operates the Giddings State School in unincorporated Lee County, near Giddings. , the Giddings State School was Lee County's largest employer.

Communities

City
 Giddings (county seat)

Town
 Lexington

Unincorporated communities

 Corinth
 Dime Box
 Hills
 Lincoln
 Old Dime Box
 Serbin

Education
School districts:
 Dime Box Independent School District
 Elgin Independent School District
 Giddings Independent School District
 Lexington Independent School District

Most of Lee County is assigned to Blinn Junior College District. Austin Community College is the designated community college for portions of Lee County in Elgin ISD.

See also

 List of memorials to Robert E. Lee
 National Register of Historic Places listings in Lee County, Texas
 Recorded Texas Historic Landmarks in Lee County

References

External links
 Lee County
 

 
1874 establishments in Texas
Populated places established in 1874